"Once in a Lifetime" is a song by the American new wave band Talking Heads, produced and cowritten by Brian Eno. It was released in November 1980 as the lead single from Talking Heads' fourth studio album, Remain in Light (1980), through Sire Records.

Eno and Talking Heads developed "Once in a Lifetime" through extensive jams, inspired by Afrobeat musicians such as Fela Kuti. David Byrne's vocals were inspired by preachers delivering sermons, with lyrics addressing existential crisis and the unconscious. The music video, directed by Byrne and Toni Basil, has Byrne dancing erratically over footage of religious rituals.

"Once in a Lifetime" was certified gold in the UK in 2021. A live version, taken from the 1984 concert film Stop Making Sense, charted in 1986 on the Billboard Hot 100. NPR named "Once in a Lifetime" one of the 100 most important American musical works of the 20th century. The Rock and Roll Hall of Fame lists it as one of the "500 Songs that Shaped Rock and Roll", and Rolling Stone ranked it at number 27 on its 2021 list of "The 500 Greatest Songs of All Time". The music video has been named among the greatest by several publications.

Production
Like other songs on Remain in Light, Talking Heads and producer Brian Eno developed "Once in a Lifetime" by recording jams, isolating the best parts, and learning to play them repetitively. Songwriter Robert Palmer joined the jam on guitar and percussion. The technique was influenced by early hip hop and the Afrobeat music of artists such as Fela Kuti, which Eno had introduced to the band. Singer David Byrne likened the process to modern looping and sampling, describing the band as "human samplers". He said the song was a result of the band trying and failing to play funk, inadvertently creating something new instead.

The track was initially not one of Eno's favorites, and the band almost abandoned it. According to keyboardist Jerry Harrison, "Because there were so few chord changes, and everything was in a sort of trance ... it became harder to write defined choruses." However, Byrne had faith in the song and felt he could write lyrics to it. Eno developed the chorus melody by singing wordlessly, and the song "fell into place". Harrison developed the "bubbly" synthesizer line and added the Hammond organ climax, taken from the Velvet Underground's "What Goes On".

Eno interpreted the rhythm differently from the band, with the third beat of the bar as the first. He encouraged the band members to interpret the beat in different ways, thereby exaggerating different rhythmic elements. According to Eno, "This means the song has a funny balance, with two centers of gravity – their funk groove, and my dubby, reggae-ish understanding of it; a bit like the way Fela Kuti songs will have multiple rhythms going on at the same time, warping in and out of each other."

According to bassist Tina Weymouth, her husband, drummer Chris Frantz, created the bassline by yelling during a jam, which she mimicked on bass guitar. She wanted to "leave lots of space for the cacophony that surrounded me. I felt like I was pounding away like a carpenter, just nailing away to get it in the groove." Eno removed the bass note from the first beat of the bar, as he felt it was too "obvious", and rerecorded the part. When Talking Heads returned to New York and Eno had gone home, the engineer had Weymouth record the bassline again. She said: "It wasn't a big fight between me and Brian, as it has sometimes been portrayed, it was just a musical dispute."

Lyrics
Byrne improvised lines as if he were giving a sermon, with a call-and-response chorus like a preacher and congregation. His vocals are "half-spoken, half-sung", with lyrics about living in a "beautiful house" with a "beautiful wife" and a "large automobile".

The Guardian writer Jack Malcolm suggested that the song can be read "as an art-pop rumination on the existential ticking time bomb of unchecked consumerism and advancing age". According to the AllMusic critic Steve Huey, the lyrics address "the drudgery of living life according to social expectations, and pursuing commonly accepted trophies (a large automobile, beautiful house, beautiful wife)". Although the singer has these trophies, he questions whether they are real and how he acquired them, a kind of existential crisis.

Byrne denied that the lyrics address yuppie greed and said the song was about the unconscious: "We operate half-awake or on autopilot and end up, whatever, with a house and family and job and everything else, and we haven't really stopped to ask ourselves, 'How did I get here? Eno observed that Byrne combined the "blood-and-thunder intonation of the preacher" with optimistic lyrics: "It's saying what a fantastic place we live in, let's celebrate it. That was a radical thing to do when everyone was so miserable and grey!"

Music video

In the "Once in a Lifetime" music video, Byrne appears in a large, empty white room, dressed in a suit, bowtie and glasses. In the background, inserted via bluescreen, footage of religious rituals or multiple Byrnes appear. Byrne dances erratically, imitating the movements of the rituals and moving in "spasmic" full-body contortions. At the end of the video, a "normal" version of Byrne appears in a black room, dressed in a white, open-collared shirt without glasses.

The video was directed by Byrne and Toni Basil and choreographed by Basil. They studied archive footage of religious rituals from around the world, including footage of evangelists, African tribes, Japanese sects and people in trances, for Byrne to incorporate his performance. The televangelist Ernest Angley was another inspiration. According to Basil, "David kind of choreographed himself. I set up the camera, put him in front of it, and asked him to absorb those ideas. Then I left the room so he could be alone with himself. I came back, looked at the videotape, and we chose physical moves that worked with the music. I just helped to stylize his moves a little." To emphasize Byrne's jerky movements, Basil used an "old-fashioned" zoom lens. The video was made on a low budget; Basil described it as "about as low-tech as you could get and still be broadcastable".

Release
In February 1981 "Once in a Lifetime" reached  on the Dutch Top 40 and in March peaked at 
 on the UK Singles Chart. In the UK it was certified silver in January 2018 and gold in April 2021. A live version, taken from the 1984 concert film Stop Making Sense, reached number 91 on the US Billboard Hot 100 in 1986. At the beginning of COVID-19 lockdowns in the US, "Once in a Lifetime" reached no. 10 on Rock Digital Song Sales.

Record World  called the single "a polyrhythmic journey through his heart of darkness" and said that "the vocal intensity and melodic beauty are enthralling."

A 12-inch promotional dance club mix was released by Sire in October 1984. An early version of "Once in a Lifetime", "Right Start", was released on the 2006 Remain in Light reissue.

Legacy 
In 1996, Kermit the Frog performed "Once in a Lifetime" on Muppets Tonight while wearing Byrne's "big suit" and mimicking his dances from Stop Making Sense. In 2000, NPR named "Once in a Lifetime" one of the 100 most important American musical works of the 20th century. In 2016, the Rock and Roll Hall of Fame listed it as one of the "500 Songs that Shaped Rock and Roll", and Malcolm Jack wrote in The Guardian that the song "is a thing of dizzying power, beauty and mystery [...] it sounds like nothing else in the history of pop."

In 2018, the musician Travis Morrison appeared on NPR's All Songs Considered, where he selected "Once in a Lifetime" as a "perfect song" and said: "The lyrics are astounding; they are meaningless and totally meaningful at the same time. That's as good as rock lyrics get." In 2021, Rolling Stone ranked "Once in a Lifetime" number 27 on its list of "The 500 Greatest Songs of All Time".

In 1989, Spin readers voted the "Once in a Lifetime" video the sixth-best of the 1980s. In 2003, the BBC critic Chris Jones described the "Once in a Lifetime" video as "hilarious" and "as compelling as it was in 1981". In 2021, Rolling Stone named it the 81st best music video.

Personnel
Talking Heads
David Byrne – lead vocals, guitar
Jerry Harrison – synthesizer, organ, backing vocals
Tina Weymouth – bass, backing vocals
Chris Frantz – drums

Additional personnel
Brian Eno – synthesizer, percussion, backing vocals
Nona Hendryx – backing vocals
Adrian Belew – guitar

Charts

Certifications

References

External links
 NPR interviews David Byrne on the occasion of the Once in Lifetime box set release on November 18, 2003

Talking Heads songs
Songs written by David Byrne
1980 singles
1981 singles
1985 singles
Songs written by Brian Eno
Sire Records singles
Song recordings produced by Brian Eno
Songs written by Jerry Harrison
Songs written by Chris Frantz
Songs written by Tina Weymouth
Live singles
1980 songs
Music videos directed by Toni Basil